Juchnowiec Dolny-Kolonia  is a settlement in the administrative district of Gmina Juchnowiec Kościelny, within Białystok County, Podlaskie Voivodeship, in north-eastern Poland.

References

Juchnowiec Dolny-Kolonia